Dave Murray is an American football coach and former player. He is the head football coach at Hamilton College in Clinton, New York, a position he has held since the 2014 season. Murray served as the head football coach at State University of New York College at Cortland from 1990 to 1996, Lebanon Valley College in 1997, and Alfred University from 1998 to 2013.

Murray is a 1981 graduate of Springfield College in Springfield, Massachusetts.

Head coaching record

References

External links
 Hamilton profile

Year of birth missing (living people)
Living people
American football linebackers
Alfred Saxons football coaches
Cortland Red Dragons football coaches
Dartmouth Big Green football coaches
Hamilton Continentals football coaches
Ithaca Bombers football coaches
Lebanon Valley Flying Dutchmen football coaches
Springfield Pride football players
Ithaca College alumni